John Amos Comenius (Latinized: Ioannes Amos Comenius; 28 March 1592 – 15 November 1670) was a Czech philosopher, pedagogue and theologian who is considered the father of modern education. He served as the last bishop of the Unity of the Brethren before becoming a religious refugee and one of the earliest champions of universal education, a concept eventually set forth in his book Didactica Magna. As an educator and theologian, he led schools and advised governments across Protestant Europe through the middle of the seventeenth century.

Comenius introduced a number of educational concepts and innovations including pictorial textbooks written in native languages instead of Latin, teaching based in gradual development from simple to more comprehensive concepts, lifelong learning with a focus on logical thinking over dull memorization, equal opportunity for impoverished children, education for women, and universal and practical instruction. Besides his native Moravia, he lived and worked in other regions of the Holy Roman Empire, and other countries: Sweden, the Polish–Lithuanian Commonwealth, Transylvania, England, the Netherlands and Hungary.

Life and work

John Amos Comenius was born in 1592 in the Margraviate of Moravia in the Bohemian Crown. His birthplace is uncertain and possibilities include Uherský Brod (as on his gravestone in Naarden), Nivnice, and Komňa (from this village he took his surname, which means "a man from Komňa"), all of which are located in Uherské Hradiště District of today's Czech Republic. John was the youngest child and only son of Martin Komenský (died 1602–4) and his wife Anna Chmelová. His grandfather, whose name was Jan (János) Szeges, was of Hungarian origin. He started to use the surname Komenský after leaving Komňa to live in Uherský Brod. Martin and Anna Komenský belonged to the Moravian Brethren, a pre-Reformation Protestant denomination, and Comenius later became one of its leaders. His parents and two of his four sisters died in 1604 and young John went to live with his aunt in Strážnice.

Owing to his impoverished circumstances he was unable to begin his formal education until later in life. He was 16 when he entered the Latin school in Přerov (he later returned to this school as a teacher 1614–1618). He continued his studies in the Herborn Academy (1611–1613) and the University of Heidelberg (1613–1614). In 1612 he read the Rosicrucian manifesto Fama Fraternitatis. Comenius was greatly influenced by the Irish Jesuit William Bathe as well as his teachers Johann Piscator, Heinrich Gutberleth, and particularly Heinrich Alsted. The Herborn school held the principle that every theory has to be functional in practical use, therefore it has to be didactic (i.e. morally instructive). In the course of his study he also became acquainted with the educational reforms of Ratichius and with the report of these reforms issued by the universities of Jena and Giessen.

Comenius became rector of a school in Přerov. In 1616 he was ordained into the ministry of the Moravian Brethren and four years later became pastor and rector at Fulnek, one of its most flourishing churches. Throughout his life this pastoral activity was his most immediate concern. In consequence of the religious wars, he lost all his property and his writings in 1621. In 1627 he led the Brethren into exile when the Habsburg Counter-Reformation persecuted the Protestants in Bohemia. In 1628 he corresponded with Johann Valentin Andreae.

He produced the book Janua linguarum reserata,  or The Gate of Languages Unlocked, which brought him to prominence. However, as the Unity of the Brethren became an important target of the Counter Reformation movement, he was forced into exile even as his fame grew across Europe. Comenius took refuge in Leszno in Poland, where he led the gymnasium and, furthermore, was given charge of the Bohemian and Moravian churches.

In 1638 Comenius responded to a request by the government of Sweden and traveled there to draw up a scheme for the management of the schools of that country,

After his religious duties, Comenius's second great interest was in furthering the Baconian attempt at the organization of all human knowledge. He became one of the leaders in the encyclopædic or pansophic movement of the seventeenth century, and, in fact, was inclined to sacrifice his more practical educational interests and opportunities for these more imposing but somewhat visionary projects. In 1639, Comenius published his Pansophiæ Prodromus, and in the following year his English friend Hartlib published, without his consent, the plan of the pansophic work as outlined by Comenius. The pansophic ideas find partial expression in the series of textbooks he produced from time to time. In these, he attempts to organize the entire field of human knowledge so as to bring it, in outline, within the grasp of every child. Comenius also attempted to design a language in which false statements were inexpressible.

In 1641, he responded to a request by the English parliament and joined a commission there charged with the reform of the system of public education. The English Civil War interfered with the latter project.  According to Cotton Mather, Comenius was asked by Winthrop to be the President of Harvard University (this being more plausibly John Winthrop the Younger than his father as junior Winthrop was in England) but in 1642, Comenius moved to Sweden instead  to work with Queen Christina (reigned 1632–1654) and the chancellor Axel Oxenstierna (in office 1612–1654) on the task of reorganizing the Swedish schools. The same year he moved to Elbląg (Elbing) in Poland  and in 1648 went to England with the aid of Samuel Hartlib, who came originally from Elbląg. In 1650 Zsuzsanna Lorántffy, widow of George I Rákóczi prince of Transylvania invited him to Sárospatak. Comenius remained there until 1654 as a professor at the first Hungarian Protestant College; he wrote some of his most important works there.

Comenius returned to Leszno. During the Deluge in 1655, he declared his support for the Protestant Swedish side, for which Polish Catholic partisans burned his house, his manuscripts, and the school's printing press in 1656. The manuscript of Pansophia was destroyed in the burning of his home in Leszno in 1657. From Leszno he took refuge in Amsterdam in the Netherlands.

In 1659, Comenius produced a new edition of the 1618 Bohemian Brethren hymnal, Kancionál, to jest kniha žalmů a písní duchovních containing 606 texts and 406 tunes. In addition to revising the psalms and hymns, his revision greatly expanded the number of hymns and added a new introduction. This edition was reissued several times, into the nineteenth century. His texts in Czech were notable poetic compositions, but he used tunes from other sources. He also edited the German hymnal Kirchen-, Haus- und Hertzens-Musica (Amsterdam, 1661), which had been published under the title Kirchengesänge since 1566. In other writings, Comenius addresses both instrumental and vocal music in many places, although he dedicated no treatise to the topic. Sometimes he follows the medieval mathematical conception of music, but in other places he links music with grammar, rhetoric, and politics. Musical practice, both instrumental and vocal, played an important role in his system of education.

He would die there, in Amsterdam, in 1670. For unclear reasons he was buried in Naarden, where visitors can see his grave in the mausoleum, located in the Kloosterstraat, devoted to him. Next to the mausoleum is the Comenius Museum.

Educational influence

The most permanent influence exerted by Comenius was in practical educational work. Few men since his days have had a greater influence though, for the greater part of the eighteenth century and the early part of the nineteenth, there was little recognition of his relationship to the current advance in educational thought and practice. The practical educational influence of Comenius was threefold. He was first a teacher and an organizer of schools, not only among his own people, but later in Sweden, and to a slight extent in Holland. In his Didactica Magna (Great Didactic), he outlined a system of schools that is the exact counterpart of the existing American system of kindergarten, elementary school, secondary school, college, and university.

In the second place, the influence of Comenius was in formulating the general theory of education. In this respect, he is the forerunner of Rousseau, Pestalozzi, Fröbel, etc., and is the first to formulate that idea of "education according to nature" so influential during the latter part of the eighteenth and early part of the nineteenth century. The influence of Comenius on educational thought is comparable with that of his contemporaries, Bacon and Descartes, on science and philosophy. In fact, he was largely influenced by the thought of these two; and his importance is largely due to the fact that he first applied or attempted to apply in a systematic manner the principles of thought and of investigation, newly formulated by those philosophers, to the organization of education in all its aspects. The summary of this attempt is given in the Didactica Magna, completed about 1631, though not published until several years later.

The third aspect of his educational influence was that on the subject matter and method of education, exerted through a series of textbooks of an entirely new nature. The first-published of these was the Janua Linguarum Reserata (The Gate of Tongues Unlocked), issued in 1631. This was followed later by a more elementary text, the Vestibulum, and a more advanced one, the Atrium, and other texts. In 1658 the Orbis Pictus was published, probably the most renowned and most widely circulated of school textbooks. It was also the first successful application of illustrations to the work of teaching, though not, as often stated, the first illustrated book for children.

These texts were all based on the same fundamental ideas: (1) learning foreign languages through the vernacular; (2) obtaining ideas through objects rather than words; (3) starting with objects most familiar to the child to introduce him to both the new language and the more remote world of objects; (4) giving the child a comprehensive knowledge of his environment, physical and social, as well as instruction in religious, moral, and classical subjects; (5) making this acquisition of a compendium of knowledge a pleasure rather than a task; and (6) making instruction universal. The importance of the Comenian influence in education has been recognized since the middle of the nineteenth century. The educational writings of Comenius comprise more than forty titles. In 1892 the three-hundredth anniversary of Comenius was very generally celebrated by educators, and at that time the Comenian Society for the study and publication of his works was formed.

Theology

John Amos Comenius was a bishop of the Unity of the Brethren church that had its roots in the teaching of Czech reformer Jan Hus. One of his most famous theological works is the Labyrinth of the World and Paradise of the Heart. The book represents his thinking about the world being full of various useless things and complex labyrinths. The true peace of mind and soul can be found only in the one's heart where Christ the Saviour should dwell and rule. This teaching is also repeated in one of his last works, Unum Necessarium (Only One is Needed), where he shows various labyrinths and problems in the world and provides simple solutions to various situations. In this book he also admits that his former believing in prophecies and revelations of those days was his personal labyrinth where he got lost many times. He was greatly influenced by Boehme.

In his Synopsis physicae ad lumen divinum reformatae, Comenius gives a physical theory of his own, said to be taken from the Book of Genesis. He was also famous for his prophecies and the support he gave to visionaries. In his Lux in tenebris he published the visions of Christopher Kotterus, Mikuláš Drabík (lat. Nicolaus Drabicius) and Kristina Poniatowska. Attempting to interpret the Book of Revelation, he promised the millennium in 1672 and guaranteed miraculous assistance to those who would undertake the destruction of the Pope and the house of Austria, even venturing to prophesy that Oliver Cromwell, Gustavus Adolphus, and George I Rákóczi, prince of Transylvania, would perform the task. He also wrote to Louis XIV of France, informing him that the empire of the world should be his reward if he would overthrow the enemies of God.

Family
One of his daughters, Elisabeth, married Peter Figulus from Jablonné nad Orlicí. Their son, Daniel Ernst Jablonski (1660–1741), Comenius's grandson, later went to Berlin in 1693; there he became the highest official pastor at the court of King Frederick I of Prussia (reigned 1701–1713). There he became acquainted with Count Nicolaus Ludwig Zinzendorf (1700–1760). Zinzendorf was among the foremost successors to Comenius as a bishop (1737–1760) in the renewed Moravian Brethren's Church.

Legacy
The Comenius Medal, a UNESCO award honouring outstanding achievements in the fields of education research and innovation, commemorates Comenius. Peter Drucker hailed Comenius as the inventor of textbooks and primers.

Czech Republic

During the 19th-century Czech National Revival, Czechs idealised Comenius as a symbol of the Czech nation. This image persists to the present day.

The Czech Republic celebrates 28 March, the birthday of Comenius, as Teachers' Day. The University of Jan Amos Komenský was founded in Prague in 2001, offering bachelor's, master's and graduate degree programmes. Gate to Languages, a project of lifelong education, taking place in the Czech Republic from October 2005 to June 2007 and aimed at language education of teachers, was named after his book Janua linguarum reserata (Gate to Languages Unlocked). Comenius is pictured on the 200 Czech koruna banknote.

Asteroid 1861 Komenský, discovered by Luboš Kohoutek, is named in his honor.

Elsewhere in Europe

In Sárospatak, Hungary, a teacher's college is named after him, which belongs to the University of Miskolc. Comenius' name has been given to primary schools in several German cities, including Bonn, Grafing, and Deggendorf. In Skopje, North Macedonia the Czechoslovak government built a school after a catastrophic 1963 earthquake and named it after Comenius (Jan Amos Komenski in Macedonian). In Poland, the Comenius Foundation is a non-governmental organisation dedicated to the provision of equal opportunities to children under 10 years of age. In 1919 Comenius University was founded by an act of parliament in Bratislava, Czechoslovakia, now in Slovakia. It was the first university with courses in Slovak.

The Italian film director Roberto Rossellini took Comenius, and especially his theory of "direct vision", as his model in the development of his didactic theories, which Rossellini hoped would usher the world into a utopian future.

Comenius is a European Union school partnership program. In the United Kingdom, the University of Sheffield's Western Bank Library holds the largest collection of Comenius manuscripts outside of the Czech Republic.

He is commemorated in the Calendar of Saints of the Evangelical Church in Germany on 16 November.

United States
In 1892 Comenius Hall, the principal classroom and faculty office building on Moravian College's campus in Pennsylvania, was built. In 1892 educators in many places celebrated the three-hundredth anniversary of Comenius, and at that time the Comenian Society for the study and publication of his works was formed. The education department at Salem College in North Carolina has an annual Comenius Symposium dedicated in his honor; the subjects usually deal with modern issues in education. The Comenius Foundation in the US, a non-profit 501(c)(3) charity, uses film and documentary production to further faith, learning, and love.

Works

Latin
 Linguae Bohemicae thesaurus, hoc est lexicon plenissimum, grammatica accurata, idiotismorum elegantiae et emphases adagiaque ("Treasure of the Czech language"), 1612–1656
 Problemata miscellanea ("Different Problems"), 1612, non-existent, perished in fire while being prepared for printing.
 Sylloge quaestionum controversarum, 1613
 Grammaticae facilioris praecepta, 1614–1616
 Theatrum universitatis rerum, 1616–1627
 Centrum securitatis ("The Center of Safety"), 1625
 Moraviae nova et post omnes priores accuratissima delineatio autore J. A. Comenio ("Map of Moravia"), 1618–1627
 Janua linguarum reserata, 1631
 Didactica magna ("The Great Didactic"), 1633–1638
 Via Lucis, Vestigata & Vestiganda ("The Way of Light"), 1641
 Januae Lingvarum Reseratae Aureae Vestibulum quo primus ad Latinam aditus Tyrunculis paratur ("Introduction to Latin"), 1648
 Schola pansophica ("School of Pansophy"), 1650–1651
 Primitiae laborum scholasticorum, 1650–1651
 Eruditionis scholasticae janua, rerum & linguarum structuram externam exhibens, 1656, doi:10.3931/e-rara-79809 (Digitized edition at e-rara).
 Opera didactica omnia ("Writing on All Learning"), 1657
Orbis Pictus ("The Visible World in Pictures"), 1658
 De bono unitatis et ordinis ("On Good Unity and Order"), 1660
 De rerum humanarum emendatione consultatio catholica ("General Consultation on an Improvement of All Things Human"), 1666
 Unum necessarium ("The One Thing Needful"), 1668
 Spicilegium Didacticum, 1680

Czech
 O andělích ("About Angels"), 1615
 Retuňk proti Antikristu a svodům jeho ("Utterance against the Antichrist and his temptations"), 1617
 O starožitnostech Moravy ("About Moravian Antiquities"), 1618–1621
 Spis o rodu Žerotínů (Script about House of Žerotín), 1618–1621
 Listové do nebe ("Letters to Heaven"), 1619
 Manuálník aneb jádro celé biblí svaté ("Manual or Core of the Whole Holy Bible"), 1620–1623
 Přemyšlování o dokonalosti kŕesťanské ("Thinking About Christian Perfection"), 1622
 Nedobytedlný hrad jméno Hospodinovo ("Unconqerable Fortress (is) Name of the God"), 1622
 Truchlivý, díl první ("The Mournful", volume I), 1623
 O poezí české ("About Czech Poetry"), 1623–1626
 Truchlivý, díl druhý ("The Mournful", volume II), 1624
 O sirobě ("About Poor People"), 1624
 Pres boží ("Press of God"), 1624
 Vidění a zjevení Kryštofa Kottera, souseda a jircháře sprotavského ("Seeing and Revelation of Kryštof Kotter, Neibourgh of Mine and Tanner from Sprotava"), 1625
 Překlad některých žalmů ("Translation of Some Psalms"), 1626
 Didaktika česká ("Czech Didactic"), 1628–1630
 Škola hrou (Schola Ludus, School by Play) 1630
 Labyrint světa a ráj srdce ("Labyrinth of the World and Paradise of the Heart") 1631
 Trouba milostivého léta pro národ český ("The Horn of the Year of Jubilee"), 1631–1632
 Brána jazyků otevřená (The Gate of Languages Unlocked) 1633
 Orbis Pictus, 1658

See also
 Moravian College
 Didactic method
 Great Didactic

References

Further reading 
 Čapková, Dagmar. Jan Amos Komenský a jeho dílo. [John Amos Comenius and His Works.] (Prague, 1945.) .
 Keatinge, The Great Didactic of Comenius (London, 1896)
 Kučera, Karel. 2014. Jan Ámos Komenský. A man in search of peace, wisdom, and proverbs. Proceedings of the Seventh Interdisciplinary Colloquium on Proverbs, November 2013, at Tavira, Portugal, ed. by Rui J. B. Soares and Outi Lauhakangas, pp. 64–73. Tavira: Tipografia Tavirense.
 Simon Somerville Laurie, John Amos Comenius (1881; sixth edition, 1898)
 Löscher, Comenius, der Pädagoge und Bischof (Leipzig, 1889)
 Monroe, Will S. Comenius and the Beginning of Educational Reform (New York, 1900) Web access
 Müller, Ein Systematiker in der Pädagogik : eine philosophisch-historische Untersuchung : Inaugural-Dissertation zur Erlangung der Doctorwürde an der philophischen Fäcultat der Universität Jena (Dresden, Bleyl und Kaemmerer, 1887)
 Robert Hebert Quick, Essays on Educational Reformers (London, 1890)

External links

 The Correspondence of Jan Amos Comenius [Komenský] (566 letters) in EMLO
 J. A. Comenius Museum in Uherský Brod
 The National Pedagogical Museum and Library of J.A. Comenius
 Comenius Museum in Přerov
 Comenius Museum & Mausoleum, Naarden, NL
 Comenius' biography
 Comenius Foundation. US
 Article by the psychologist Jean Piaget on the importance of Comenius (PDF)
 Jan Amos Comenius Bibliography
 Didactica Magna
 Unum Necessarium: The One Thing Necessary. Translation by Vernon H. Nelson provided courtesy of Moravian Archives, Winston-Salem, NC
 Dveře gazyků otewřené. Praha: [s.n.], 1805. 280 s. - available at ULB's Digital Library
 Janua Linguarum Reserata Quinque-Linguis. Amstelodami : Apud Ludovicum & Danielem Elzevirios, 1661. 881 s.  - available at ULB's Digital Library
 Janua Linguarum reserata aurea. Pragae : Typis Archi-Episcopalibus in Collegio S. Norberti excudebat paulus Postrzibacz, Anno 1667. 506 s.  - available at ULB's Digital Library
 
 
 
  
 Orbis sensualium pictus at Internet Archive
  - translation by Charles Hoole, at Google Book Search
Orbis sensualium pictus trilinguis. Latin, German and Hungarian, 1708
 Orbis sensualium pictus trilinguis. Leutschoviae : Typis Samuelis Brewer, Anno Salutis 1685. 484 s.  - - available at ULB's Digital Library
 Orbis Pictus, in hungaricum et germanicum translatus. Po'sonban: Weber, 19. stor. 172 s. - available at ULB's Digital Library
 Orbis pictus von Amos Comenius. [Nürnberg]: [s.n.], 1770. 263 s. - available at ULB's Digital Library

 
1592 births
1670 deaths
17th-century bishops
17th-century Bohemian people
17th-century Bohemian writers
17th-century Dutch philosophers
17th-century Latin-language writers
17th-century Protestant theologians
All articles with unsourced statements
Bishops of the Moravian Church
Burials in North Holland
Czech bishops
Czech educational theorists
Czech emigrants to the Dutch Republic
Czech exiles
Czech expatriates in Germany
Czech expatriates in Hungary
Czech expatriates in the Dutch Republic
Czech male writers
Czech people of Hungarian descent
Czech people of the Moravian Church
Czech philosophers
Czech Protestant clergy
Czech Renaissance humanists
Czech schoolteachers
Czech scientists
Czech theologians
Grammarians from the Czech Republic
Heidelberg University alumni
People from Uherské Hradiště District
Philosophy and thought in the Dutch Republic
Writers of the Moravian Church
Philosophers of education
Lutheran saints